Château Gloria is an unclassed Bordeaux wine from the Saint-Julien appellation. The winery is located in the central part of France’s Bordeaux wine region Haut-Médoc, in the commune of Saint-Julien-Beychevelle. 

Regarded as a well-made wine with the best characteristics of Saint-Julien, it is estimated by many to be on a par with the classed growths.

The château also produces a second wine from its younger vines named Château Peymartin.

History
A relatively young estate, Château Gloria was founded and assembled by Monsieur Henri Martin who established the reputation of Gloria within the space of a generation.

The estate was included in the proposal by INAO to revise the 1855 classification, and subsequently became listed in the private classification of Alexis Lichine.

The current proprietor of the estate is Martin's son-in-law, Jean-Louis Triaud.

Production
The vineyard area extends , with the grape variety distribution of 65% Cabernet Sauvignon, 25% Merlot, 5% Cabernet Franc and 5% Petit verdot. 

An average of 20,000 cases of the Grand vin are produced annually. Of the second wine Chateau Peymartin there are produced approximately 4,000 cases.

References

    

Footnotes

External links
Château Gloria official site 

Bordeaux wine producers